Ribhu Dasgupta is an Indian film and television director.  He made his directorial debut with 2011 film Michael.

He was nominated at the Shanghai International Film Festival for Asian New Talent Award of Best Film for the film Michael.

Biography 
Born in Kolkata, Ribhu's father, Raja Dasgupta, and grandfather, Harisadhan Dasgupta, are a filmmaker and noted documentary filmmaker, respectively. Bengali filmmaker Birsa Dasgupta is his brother in relation. Towards the end of 2004 he went to Mumbai from Kolkata and stayed with his brother Birsa. In Mumbai he worked as an assistant to filmmaker Anurag Kashyap. His first film as an Assistant director was 1971, which was directed by Amrit Sagar.

Filmography

References

External links 
 

Living people
Bengali film directors
Hindi-language film directors
Year of birth missing (living people)
Place of birth missing (living people)
Indian television directors